The 2015 Don Smallgoods Australian FIM Speedway Grand Prix was the twelfth and final round of the 2015 Speedway Grand Prix season. It took place on 24 October at the Etihad Stadium in Melbourne, Australia.

Riders 
Australian rider Sam Masters was given the wildcard for the event. Fellow Aussies Justin Sedgemen and three time reigning Australian Under-21 Champion Max Fricke were named as the reserves.

Masters was involved in a heated clash with triple World Champion Nicki Pedersen at the end of Heat 8. Unhappy that Pedersen had squeezed him close to the wall on the back straight, the two exchanged words at the pit gate. Then as Masters was walking back to his pit he was confronted by Pedersen's mechanic Marek Hu. More words were exchanged and Masters punched Hu before being led away. For his actions Masters was fined by the FIM.

Results 
American Greg Hancock, who had won the only previous SGP of Australia in 2002, was unbeaten on the night to take his 20th Speedway Grand Prix win in his record 81st SGP Final. Danish star Niels-Kristian Iversen finished second with Poland's Maciej Janowski in third place. Reigning Australian Champion Jason Doyle qualified for the final but was outed in a crash in the first turn in which he suffered neck and chest injuries. A fully conscious Doyle was then transported to the Royal Melbourne Hospital for observation. Greg Hancock took control of the re-run from the start and was never headed. His win also saw him finish in second place in the World Championship standings.

Going into the second semi-final, Denmark's Peter Kildemand needed 4 points to join Australia's 2012 World Champion Chris Holder on 95 points for the season and force a run-off for the last automatic qualifying spot in the 2016 series. Tai Woffinden won the start of the second semi, but down the back straight Kildemand flew past into the lead and looked set for a place in the final where he would only need to finish second to secure his place or third to force the run-off. Unfortunately however, Woffinden fell on lap two and the race was stopped and re-run with the 2015 World Champion excluded. Kildemand could not repeat his effort in the re-run and finished in third place behind Niels-Kristian Iversen and Maciej Janowski, missing his chance for automatic qualification. However, as there are 15 permanent riders in the SGP, Kildemand as the 9th-place finisher in 2015 received one of the wildcard spots for the season essentially giving him automatic qualification for 2016.

Heat details

The intermediate classification

See also 
 motorcycle speedway

References 

2015 Speedway Grand Prix
Speedway in Australia
2015 in Australian motorsport